The 1993 World Short Track Speed Skating Team Championships was the 3rd edition of the World Short Track Speed Skating Team Championships which took place on 20 March 1993 in Budapest, Hungary.

Medal winners

Results

Men

Women

References

External links
 Results
 Results book

World Short Track Speed Skating Team Championships
1993 World Short Track Speed Skating Team Championships